German verbs are conjugated depending on their use: as in English, they are modified depending on the persons (identity) and number of the subject of a sentence, as well as depending on the tense and mood.

The citation form of German verbs is the infinitive form, which generally consists of the bare form of the verb with -(e)n added to the end. To conjugate regular verbs, this is removed and replaced with alternative endings: Radical: mach-
 To do; machen
 I do; ich mache
 He does; er macht
 I did; ich machte
 He did; er machte

In general, irregular forms of German verbs exist to make for easier and clearer pronunciation, with a vowel sound in the centre of the word the only part of the word that changes in an unexpected way (though endings may also be slightly different). This modification is often a moving of the vowel sound to one pronounced further forward in the mouth. This process is called the Germanic umlaut. However, a number of verbs including sein (to be) are fully irregular, as in English I am and I was sound completely different.
 To know; wissen Radical: wiss- wuss- 
 I know; ich weiß or weiss (vowel change; -e missing) (irregular)
 I knew; ich wusste (vowel change; otherwise regular)
 To sing; singen
 I sing; ich singe (regular)
 I sang; ich sang (vowel change; -te missing)

For many German tenses, the verb itself is locked in a non-varying form of the infinitive or past participle (which normally starts with ge-) that is the same regardless of the subject, and then joined to an auxiliary verb that is conjugated. This is similar to English grammar, though the primary verb is normally placed at the end of the clause. Note that in both the examples shown below the auxiliary verb is irregular.
 I buy the book; Ich kaufe das Buch.
 I will buy the book; Ich werde das Buch kaufen.
 She will buy the book; Sie wird das Buch kaufen.
 I have bought the book; Ich habe das Buch gekauft.
 She has bought the book; Sie hat das Buch gekauft.

The following tenses and modi are formed by direct conjugation of the verb:
 Present – Präsens
 Imperfect – Imperfekt or Präteritum
 Imperative – Imperativ
 Perfect – Perfekt (past participle, does not vary by subject)
 Conditional I and II – Konjunktiv

Below is a paradigm of German verbs, that is, a set of conjugation tables, for the model regular verbs and for some of the most common irregular verbs, including the irregular auxiliary verbs.

German tenses and moods
German verbs have forms for a range of subjects, indicating number and social status:
 First-person singular: 'I'; ich
 Second-person familiar: 'you' (as used to a friend); du
 Second-person familiar: 'you' (as used to a friend); Du (possible form in letters, traditionally used for all kinds of addresses)
 Third person: 'he', 'she', 'it'; (er, sie, es) with the same form for all three
 First-person plural: 'we'; wir
 Second-person plural: ihr
 Second-person polite: 'you'; Sie (which is always capitalised)
 Third-person plural: 'they'; sie (not capitalised)

The subject does not have to be one of these pronouns, but can instead be anything that has the same person and number. For example, in the sentences Der Ball ist rund. ("The ball is round.") and Es ist rund. ("It is round."), the verb is in the same form: third-person singular.

In German, the first-person and third-person plural and second-person plural-polite forms are identical for all verbs in every tense. Sie in the second person is used to address one or more people of high status.

As a summary of German tenses, moods and aspects:
 The German present tense matches both the English present ("I walk to work every day") and also the present progressive ("I am walking to work right now"), to which standard German has no direct equivalent. (See below for a colloquial alternative.) It is formed similarly to the English present tense, by directly conjugating the relevant verb to match the subject.
 The perfect (I have gone to work; also sometimes called the present perfect) is mostly formed, again as in English, from the appropriate present tense form of 'to have' (haben) and a past participle of the relevant verb placed at the end of the clause. Some intransitive verbs involving motion or change take 'to be' (sein) instead of haben; this may depend on the exact meaning of the sentence. Note that both haben and sein are used in the present tense, and are irregular verbs.
 'He has read the book': Er hat das Buch gelesen. (Literally, "He has the book read.")
 'He has gone to the cinema': Er ist ins Kino gegangen. (but literally, "He is into the cinema gone.")
 The imperfect (I closed the door; usually avoided when speaking) is formed from the verb, as in English. The verb may be regular or irregular.
 The pluperfect (I had read the book, when...) is formed in the same way as in English: identically to the perfect, except with an imperfect form of haben or sein instead of a present tense form.
 He had read the book; Er hatte das Buch gelesen.
 He had gone to the cinema; Er war ins Kino gegangen.
 The future tense (I will read the book or I'm going to read the book) is formed from the appropriate present tense form of the verb werden (to become) and, as in English, the infinitive of the relevant verb.
 I will read the book: Ich werde das Buch lesen.
 A classic but easily avoided mistake made by English-speakers learning German is to use "Ich will" – which actually means I want to.
 The imperative (Be quiet!, Open the door!) is formed by direct conjugation of the verb and varies by number and status of the people addressed, unlike English which always uses an infinitive.
 Be quiet: Sei ruhig! (when speaking to one person); but Seien Sie ruhig! when speaking to an authority figure. Sei and Seien are both formed from sein (be).
 The conditional (I would do it) can be formed from würden (would) and the infinitive of the relevant verb, placed at the end of the clause.
 I would love her; Ich würde sie lieben.
 Additional forms of the conditional (known as Konjunktiv I & II, for the present and imperfect) also exist. They are equivalent to English forms such as If I were rich or If I loved him, (but also It would be great) and exist for every verb in the present and imperfect tense. They are often avoided for uncommon verbs. For the future tense conditional, the conditional form of werden is used with an infinitive.
 If I were rich; Wenn ich reich wäre, ...
 If I had more money; Wenn ich mehr Geld hätte, ...
 It would be fantastic; Es wäre fantastisch
 The passive (It is done) may be formed for any tense. It is formed from the past participle and the appropriate form of the verb werden (to become).
 The lawn is being mowed; Der Rasen wird gemäht (Literally, "The lawn becomes/is becoming mowed.")
 The lawn was mowed; Der Rasen wurde gemäht. (Literally, "The lawn became/was becoming mowed.")
 The lawn has been mowed; Der Rasen ist gemäht geworden.
 The lawn will be mowed; Der Rasen wird gemäht werden. (This uses the verb werden twice in one sentence, but is still quite correct.)
 The lawn would be mowed; Der Rasen würde gemäht werden.
 Many German verbs can be converted into the names of jobs, adjectives and verbal nouns describing processes (as English to clean becomes the cleaner, the man cleaning the window and the cleaning process). These generally follow regular patterns, with endings such as -en and -ung. Colloquial German, in particular in the Rhineland and Ruhr areas, uses these verbal nouns with sein to create a kind of present progressive known as the rheinische Verlaufsform:
 I'm working; "Ich bin am Arbeiten."
 Note that Arbeiten is not a verb as in the English equivalent but a noun, and is therefore capitalised. A literal translation would be: "I'm at the working."
 A colloquial method to express future actions is to use present tense with an adjective like tomorrow showing that the event will happen in the future:
 Tomorrow, I am going to buy groceries; Morgen kaufe ich Lebensmittel. (Literally, Tomorrow, I buy groceries.)

Regular -en verbs (weak verbs) (lieben, to love)
The following tables include only the active simple tenses: those formed by direct conjugation from the verb.

The ending -e in the imperative singular is almost obligatorily lost in colloquial usage. In the standard language it may be lost or not: lieb! or liebe!, sag! or sage!

The ending -e in the first-person singular of the present is always kept in normal written style (ich liebe, ich sage), but may also be lost in colloquial usage (ich lieb', ich sag). This occurs more often than not in the middle of a sentence, somewhat less frequently if the verb comes to stand in the end of a sentence.

Regular -n verbs (weak verbs) (handeln, to act)
When a verb stem ends in -el or -er, the ending -en is dropped in favor of -n.

Regular -ten verbs (weak  verbs) (arbeiten, to work)
When a verb stem ends in -t, an intermediate -e- is added before most endings to prevent a large consonant cluster.

Irregular -en verbs (strong  verbs) (fahren, to drive)
Certain verbs change their stem vowel for the second-person and third-person singular forms. These usually follow one of three patterns:
 e → 
 e → i
 a → ä

Irregular -en verbs (strong  verbs) (geben, to give)
Certain verbs change their stem vowels for the preterite indicative and subjunctive. These changes are unique for each verb.

Irregular verbs (gehen, to go, to walk)
{| border="2" cellpadding="4" cellspacing="0" style="margin: 1em 1em 1em 0; background: #f9f9f9; border: 1px #aaa solid; border-collapse: collapse; font-size: 95%;"
!bgcolor="#E0E0FF"|Non-finite||colspan="6"|
|-
|Infinitiv Präsens ||colspan="6"| gehen
|-
|Infinitiv Futur I||colspan="6"| gehen werden
|-
|substantivierter Infinitiv ||colspan="6"| das Gehen (gen. des Gehens)
|-
|Partizip I Praesens||colspan="6"|gehend (gehender, gehende, gehendes, gehende)
|-
|Partizip II (Perfekt)||colspan="6"|geen (geener, geene, geenes, geene)
|-
!bgcolor="#E0E0FF"|Indikativ||ich||du||er/sie/es||wir||ihr||sie/Sie
|-
|Präsens||gehe||gehst||geht||gehen||geht||gehen
|-
|Präteritum||||st||||en||t||en
|-
|Futur I||werde gehen||wirst gehen||wird gehen||werden gehen||werdet gehen||werden gehen
|-
!bgcolor="#E0E0FF"|Konditional||ich||du||er/sie/es||wir||ihr||sie/Sie
|-
|Präsens||würde gehen||würdest gehen||würde gehen||würden gehen||würdet gehen||würden gehen
|-
!bgcolor="#E0E0FF"|Konjunktiv||ich||du||er/sie/es||wir||ihr||sie/Sie
|-
|Konjunktiv I||gehe||gehest||gehe||gehen||gehet||gehen
|-
|Konjunktiv II||e||est||e||en||et||en
|-
|Futur I||werde gehen||werdest gehen||werde gehen||werden gehen||werdet gehen||werden gehen
|-
!bgcolor="#E0E0FF"|Imperativ|| ||du|| ||wir||ihr||Sie
|-
| || ||geh(e)'|| ||gehen||geht|| gehen|}

Modal verbs (dürfen, may)
In modal verbs, the stem vowel will change for all conjugations of the singular simple present. These changes are unique to each verb. In addition, the ending will be missing for the first and third person conjugations of the singular simple present.

werden (to become, shall, will)

Irregular verbs sein (to be)

haben (to have)

tun (to do)
{| border="2" cellpadding="4" cellspacing="0" style="margin: 1em 1em 1em 0; background: #f9f9f9; border: 1px #aaa solid; border-collapse: collapse; font-size: 95%;"
!bgcolor="#E0E0FF"|Non-finite||colspan="6"|
|-
|Infinitiv Präsens ||colspan="6"| tun|-
|Infinitiv Futur I||colspan="6"| tun werden|-
|substantivierter Infinitiv ||colspan="6"| das Tun (gen. des Tuns)
|-
|Partizip I Praesens||colspan="6"|tuend (tuender, tuende, tuendes, tuende)
|-
|Partizip II (Perfekt)||colspan="6"|getn (getner, getne, getnes, getne)
|-
!bgcolor="#E0E0FF"|Indikativ||ich||du||er/sie/es||wir||ihr||sie/Sie
|-
|Präsens||tue||tust||tut||tun||tut||tun
|-
|Präteritum||tt||ttest||tt||tten||ttet||tten
|-
|Futur I||werde tun||wirst tun||wird tun||werden tun||werdet tun||werden tun
|-
!bgcolor="#E0E0FF"|Konditional||ich||du||er/sie/es||wir||ihr||sie/Sie
|-
|Präsens||würde tun||würdest tun||würde tun||würden tun||würdet tun||würden tun
|-
!bgcolor="#E0E0FF"|Konjunktiv||ich||du||er/sie/es||wir||ihr||sie/Sie
|-
|Konjunktiv I||tue||tuest||tue||tuen||tuet||tuen
|-
|Konjunktiv II||tte||ttest||tte||tten||ttet||tten
|-
|Futur I||werde tun||werdest tun||werde tun||werden tun||werdet tun||werden tun
|-
!bgcolor="#E0E0FF"|Imperativ|| ||du|| ||wir||ihr||Sie
|-
| || ||tu(e)|| ||tun||tut|| tun
|}

Separable and inseparable verbs
In German, prepositions and modifying prefixes are frequently attached to verbs to alter their meaning. Verbs so formed are divided into separable verbs which detach the prefix under certain circumstances and inseparable verbs which do not. The conjugations are identical to that of the root verb, and the position of the prefix for both separable and inseparable verbs follows a standard pattern. The prefix's effect on the verb is highly unpredictable, so normally the meaning of each new verb has to be learned separately. (See German verbs for further information on the meanings of common prefixes.)

Separable verbs detach their prefixes in the present, imperfect and imperative. The prefix is placed at the end of the clause. The past participle is the prefix attached to the normal past participle. The infinitive keeps the prefix where it is used, for example in the conditional and future tenses.
 nehmen — "to take" (irregular verb)
 Er nimmt das Buch — He is taking the book. (Vowel change)
 Er hat das Buch genommen — He has taken the book. (Vowel change and the -en ending common with irregular verbs)
 Er wird das Buch nehmen — He will take the book. (Future tense)
 zunehmen — to increase (or put on weight)
 Es nimmt schnell zu — It is quickly increasing
 Es hat schnell zugenommen — It has quickly increased
 Er wird es schnell zunehmen — He will increase it quickly. (Increase is being used in the infinitive as this is the future tense.)

Inseparable verbs retain the prefix at all times. The past participle has the prefix in place of ge- but keeps any irregularities of the root verb's past participle.
 kaufen — "to buy" (regular verb)
 Ich kaufe es — I buy it
 Ich habe es gekauft — I have bought it
 verkaufen — to sell
 Ich verkaufe es — I sell it
 Ich habe es verkauft — I have sold it (regular apart from ver- replacing ge-)

A number of verbs are separable with one meaning and inseparable with another. For example, übersetzen means "to translate" as an inseparable verb but "to ferry" as a separable verb.

Notes

External links
 German verb conjugation lesson Grammar lesson covering the conjugation of German verbs
 Online German verb conjugation Free online German verb conjugation

German grammar
Indo-European verbs